Lake Tamula is a lake in southern Estonia, located on the southeastern side of the town of Võru. The lake has an area of 2.313 km², average depth is 4.2 m and maximum depth 7.5 m.

On 11 September 2010 Estonian shot putter Taavi Peetre drowned in Lake Tamula during a fishing trip.

See also
List of lakes in Estonia
Lake Vagula

References

Tamula
Võru
Tamula
Tourist attractions in Võru County